discoverIE Group plc is an international designer and manufacturer of specialised electronic components for industrial use. It is listed on the London Stock Exchange and is a constituent of the FTSE 250 Index.

History 
The company was established as a supplier of electronic components known as Acal plc by businessman, John Curry, in 1986. Acquisitions have included BFI Optilas, a distributor of electronic and photonic components, for £12.6 million in October 2009 and Myrra Group, a manufacturer of magnetic electronic products, for £11.3 million in April 2013. Subsequent acquisitions included Trafo Holding AS, a Norwegian manufacturer of electromagnetic products, for £73.5 million in July 2014 and Foss As Fiberoptisk Systemsalg, a fibre optics business, for approximately NOK 140 million in January 2015.

The company changed its name from Acal to discoverIE Group (short for discover Innovative Electronics) in November 2017.

References

External links
 Official site

Companies listed on the London Stock Exchange
Companies based in Guildford
Companies established in 1986